The 1929 United Kingdom general election in Northern Ireland was held on 30 May as part of the wider general election. There were ten constituencies, seven single-seat constituencies with elected by FPTP and three two-seat constituencies with MPs elected by bloc voting.

Results
The Nationalist Party ran in this election, having not contested the previous election in 1924. It regained the two seats in Fermanagh and Tyrone it had held from 1922 to 1924.

In the election as a whole, the Conservative Party, which included the Ulster Unionists, led by Stanley Baldwin, lost its majority and the Labour Party formed a minority government with Ramsay MacDonald as Prime Minister.

MPs elected

By-election

Footnotes

References

Northern Ireland
1929
1929 elections in Northern Ireland
May 1929 events